Lieutenant General Sir Wellesley Douglas Studholme Brownrigg KCB DSO (21 April 1886 – 7 February 1946) was a senior British Army officer who became Military Secretary.

Military career
Brownrigg was educated at Mulgrave Castle and later entered and then graduated from the Royal Military College, Sandhurst, and was commissioned into the 1st Battalion, the Sherwood Foresters in 1905. He became adjutant of his regiment in 1910.

He served in the First World War in the 13th Division and fought at Gallipoli in 1915 and then in Mesopotamia during the remaining years of the war. He was awarded the Distinguished Service Order (DSO) in 1916 and ended the war in 1918 as a lieutenant colonel and had also been mentioned in dispatches six times.

After the War he became deputy assistant adjutant general at the War Office and, after attending the Staff College, Camberley, from 1920−1921, then became an instructor at the Royal Military College Sandhurst. He returned to the War Office as a general service officer in 1923 and became assistant adjutant and quartermaster general for the Shanghai Defence Force in China in 1927. He was placed in charge of Administration for the North China Command in 1928. He was appointed commander of 159th (Welsh Border) Infantry Brigade in 1933 and general officer commanding 51st (Highland) Division in 1935.

He became Military Secretary in 1938 and director general of the Territorial Army in 1939.

He took part in World War II as adjutant-general of the British Expeditionary Force in 1939 and retired in 1940. He was a sector and zone commander for the Home Guard for the rest of the war. In late 1942, Brownrigg was employed as the military advisor for the British film The Life and Death of Colonel Blimp. The film was about an officer called Major-General Wynne-Candy, whose fictional career was rather similar to Brownrigg's, as he had served with distinction in the First World War, was retired after Dunkirk and then had taken a senior role in the Home Guard.

Personal life 
In 1919 he married Mona Jeffreys. Sir Douglas Brownrigg and Lady Brownrigg were keen dog breeders who imported two of the first Shih Tzus into the United Kingdom from China. His memoirs; Unexpected (a book of memories), were published in 1942.

References

Bibliography

External links
British Army Officers 1939−1945
Generals of World War II

|-
 

1886 births
1946 deaths
Sherwood Foresters officers
British Army generals of World War II
British Home Guard officers
Knights Commander of the Order of the Bath
Companions of the Distinguished Service Order
War Office personnel in World War II
British Army personnel of World War I
Academics of the Royal Military College, Sandhurst
Graduates of the Staff College, Camberley
Graduates of the Royal Military College, Sandhurst
People from Chelsea, London
British Army lieutenant generals
Military personnel from London